Laurence George Buchanan (born 9 March 1976) is an English former first-class cricketer.

Bryant was born at Perivale in March 1976 and later studied at Keble College, Oxford. While studying at Oxford, he played first-class cricket for Oxford University, making his debut against Yorkshire at Oxford in 1997. He made a further nine first-class appearances across the 1997–98 seasons, scoring 170 runs at an average of 15.45 and with a high score of 43 not out.

References

External links

1976 births
Living people
People from Perivale
Alumni of Keble College, Oxford
English cricketers
Oxford University cricketers